Gunda Dhur was a tribal leader from village Nethanar in Jagdalpur tehsil, of Bastar district, in present-day Chhattisgarh. He played a major role in 1910 rebellion of the Dhurwas of Kanger forest in Bastar, and led the rebellion. He is considered as a hero by many tribals of Bastar

Memorial
On 10 February 2020, a statue made by the tribal community was unveiled at Kanker, Chhattisgarh by the Chief Minister of Chhattisgarh Bhupesh Baghel.

References

Indian activists
Tribal chiefs
People from Bastar district
Indian revolutionaries